Miroslav Hlinka (31 August 1972 – 14 September 2014) was a Slovak professional ice hockey player and assistant coach.

He played both for Czech and Slovak national ice hockey team. He won the 2002 Men's World Ice Hockey Championships with Slovak national ice hockey team.

Personal life and death
He was the cousin of Czech national team player Jaroslav Hlinka and the son of former player Miroslav Hlinka sr.

On 14 September 2014 he committed suicide in a hotel in Banská Bystrica. He is survived by his wife, his son Michal and his daughter Vanesa.

Career statistics

Regular season and playoffs

International

References

External links

1972 births
2014 suicides
Sportspeople from Trenčín
Czech ice hockey forwards
Slovak ice hockey forwards
HK Dukla Trenčín players
HK Trnava players
HC '05 Banská Bystrica players
HC Sparta Praha players
HC Spartak Moscow players
PSG Berani Zlín players
Jokerit players
Modo Hockey players
MsHK Žilina players
Piráti Chomutov players
HC Dynamo Pardubice players
HC Karlovy Vary players
HC Slovan Bratislava players
Suicides in Slovakia
2014 deaths
Czech expatriate ice hockey players in Finland
Czech expatriate ice hockey players in Sweden
Czech expatriate ice hockey players in Russia
Slovak expatriate ice hockey players in Finland
Slovak expatriate ice hockey players in Russia
Slovak expatriate ice hockey players in Sweden